Rosa Fuentes (born November 30, 1965) is a former female freestyle swimmer from Mexico. She participated at the 1984 Summer Olympics for her native country. Her best and only result in Los Angeles, California was the 11th place in the Women's 4 × 100 m Freestyle Relay, alongside Patricia Kohlmann, Teresa Rivera and Irma Huerta.

References
Profile

1965 births
Living people
Mexican female freestyle swimmers
Swimmers at the 1984 Summer Olympics
Olympic swimmers of Mexico
Pan American Games bronze medalists for Mexico
Pan American Games medalists in swimming
Central American and Caribbean Games gold medalists for Mexico
Swimmers at the 1983 Pan American Games
Central American and Caribbean Games medalists in swimming
Competitors at the 1982 Central American and Caribbean Games
Medalists at the 1983 Pan American Games
21st-century Mexican women
20th-century Mexican women